New England Coaches is an Australian coach company operating services in Northern New South Wales and South East Queensland.

History
New England Coaches is a coach operator, based in Glen Innes. Trading as Arandale Coaches, it operated route and school services for many years, gradually selling these.

In 2010, it commenced operating a coach service from Tamworth to Port Macquarie. This ceased in May 2011. The formerly operated Tamworth to Port Macquarie service has been reinstated as Tamworth to Coffs Harbour, operating Mondays, Wednesdays and Fridays.

In July 2012, New England Coaches commenced operating a service from Tamworth to Warwick where it connects with Crisps Coaches services to Toowoomba and Brisbane. It also operates a coach service from Tamworth to Coffs Harbour.

Fleet
As at September 2022, the fleet consisted of six coaches.

References

External links

Bus Australia gallery

Bus companies of New South Wales
Bus transport in Queensland